Brampton Christian School, formerly Kennedy Road Tabernacle Christian School, founded in 1977, is a private school in Caledon, Ontario, Canada. It is owned by Kennedy Road Tabernacle.

Arts
The high school's music department has two bands, Academy Band and Jazz band, as well as a Junior Jazz Band in the junior high. It also has a vocal ensemble that performs at concerts and other events.

Athletics
The high school's team is called the BCS Bobcats. There are teams for badminton, basketball, cross-country, soccer, swimming, track and field, and volleyball. The teams participate in Ontario Federation of School Athletic Associations, Region of Peel Secondary Schools Athletic Association, and Ontario Christian Secondary Schools Athletic Association tournaments.

References

External links
 
 Kennedy Road Tabernacle

High schools in Caledon, Ontario
Private schools in Ontario
Educational institutions established in 1977
Christian schools in Canada
1977 establishments in Ontario